The 2014–15 season is the 127th competitive association football season in India.

Changes in the I-League

Teams promoted to the 2014–15 I-League:
 Royal Wahingdoh

Teams expelled from the 2014–15 I-League:
 Churchill Brothers
 Rangdajied United
 United S.C.

Teams relegated from the 2014–15 I-League:
 Mohammedan

Internationals

Men

International Friendlies

2018 FIFA World Cup qualifier

I-League

Transfers

Indian Super League

Finals

References

 
Seasons in Indian football